Anaang may refer to:
 Anaang people
 Anaang language

Language and nationality disambiguation pages